Arundel is a small rural village about  north of Geraldine, in the Canterbury region in the South Island of New Zealand. It is near the south bank of the Rangitata River,  from Peel Forest, an extensive podocarp forest with abundant birdlife. Arundel is flat and fertile, with fields and many mature trees.

Arundel has some historical importance. The nearby bridge over the Rangitata River was built in 1872, and was the only bridge linking South Canterbury with the rest of Canterbury until the 1930s when the road bridges on State Highway 1 were constructed. This gave Arundel an important position at the South Canterbury end of the bridge, and the village site was reserved in 1874, two years after the bridge was built. However, the population of Arundel has never exceeded 100.

There is a small cemetery south-west of the village, with over 160 graves approached through an avenue of flowering cherry trees.

Arundel is in the Carew Peel Forest School zoning school area.

Demographics

Arundel had a population of 1,368 at the 2018 New Zealand census, an increase of 60 people (4.6%) since the 2013 census, and an increase of 246 people (21.9%) since the 2006 census. There were 528 households. There were 693 males and 672 females, giving a sex ratio of 1.03 males per female. The median age was 43.7 years (compared with 37.4 years nationally), with 282 people (20.6%) aged under 15 years, 192 (14.0%) aged 15 to 29, 681 (49.8%) aged 30 to 64, and 213 (15.6%) aged 65 or older.

Ethnicities were 94.1% European/Pākehā, 2.9% Māori, 0.4% Pacific peoples, 2.0% Asian, and 3.1% other ethnicities (totals add to more than 100% since people could identify with multiple ethnicities).

The proportion of people born overseas was 14.7%, compared with 27.1% nationally.

Although some people objected to giving their religion, 52.0% had no religion, 38.2% were Christian, 0.4% were Hindu, 0.4% were Buddhist and 0.9% had other religions.

Of those at least 15 years old, 210 (19.3%) people had a bachelor or higher degree, and 189 (17.4%) people had no formal qualifications. The median income was $38,800, compared with $31,800 nationally. The employment status of those at least 15 was that 627 (57.7%) people were employed full-time, 210 (19.3%) were part-time, and 12 (1.1%) were unemployed.

References

Timaru District
Populated places in Canterbury, New Zealand